The Ministry of Information and Communications Technology, or Ministry of ICT  established in 1908, is responsible for postal services, telephones and information technology in the Islamic Republic of Iran.

Laying out and implementing policies pertaining to postal services is the functions of the Ministry of Information and Communication Technology (ICT), which is also in charge of issuing import licenses for certain communication devices and parts thereof such as a mobile phone.

History
The postal service in Iran was handled by a bureau before 1876 and all postal affairs have were done by a bureau. In the same year that it was formed, it showed success in terms of social and monetary value and then in the same year this bureau converted into a full Ministry by the ordered issued by Naser-aldin Shah. The order stated that, Amin-almolk, the Minister of Tasks and Council, be selected for executing the operations (postal services) of Ministry of ICT. After a year working as a Minister of ICT, in 1877, he resigned from the Ministry of Tasks And Council & decided to dedicate more of his time to the Ministry of ICT. During the 19th century, this ministry was administered by Amin-almolk, as the minister and Mirza Rahim as the deputy Minister of ICT.

In 1882, a book was published (lithographed booklet named "the Tariff of the Great Post Office of Iran"). It displayed maps of the telegram offices, post offices, pony post roads and postal network in the 19th-century Iran. That booklet talked about Iran having seven main and five secondary postal lines. After the late 1800s, there were no major revision to Iranian Ministry of the Post, other than the normal organizational and structural changes. After the presidency of Amir Kabir, new renovations appeared in the post of Iran. The posts during the era of Imperialists suspended the extracurricular activities were in suspension and the postal services became fast, according to the Amir Kabir"s discipline. 

The Postal services Ministry had an organization restructuring in 1906. Telegraph bureau was put under the administration of the Postal ministry and the Ministry of Post and Telegraph formed. The first telephone patent assigned to Basir-ol-mamalek in 1900 and since then the telephone services started working in Tehran. In 1929, the Ministry of Postal and Telegraph offered a proposal to the parliament for purchasing the stocks of the only Telephone Company. Then the Ministry of Post, Telegraph, and Telephone was formed after the government purchased the stocks of the only Telephone Company.

After the 1929, many development projects were done to the ministry until 2003. There were several subsidiary company and centers which went through many evolutions and were able to spread communication solutions inside Iran. In 2003, a bill of duties and responsibilities in the parliament of Iran decided to rename the ministry from "Ministry of P.T.T" to "Ministry of I.C.T". The Bill also brought a structural reform to the Ministry of I.C.T. It contained new laws and mandates from the Parliament. Thus three private companies: Data Communication Company, acquired by the I.C.T in 2005 and T.I.C and M.C.I were established beside T.C.I. Some of the evolutions are establishing T.C.I and I.R.I Post Company as well as organizing two organizations named I.S.A and C.R.A, and also working to build two new councils named "High Council of IT" and "Space Council".

List of Ministers

See also
Communications in Iran
Internet in Iran
Telecommunication Company of Iran (TCI)
Iranian Space Agency

References

External links
 Webpage of the Ministry of Information and Communication Technology

1908 establishments in Iran
Information And Communications Technology
Iran
Information And Communications Technology (Iran)
Iran
Iranian entities subject to the U.S. Department of the Treasury sanctions